This is a list of all-time NK Krško players.

  Adnan Zildžović
  Fuad Gazibegović
  Armin Lulić
  Dalibor Bojović
  Darko Bojović
  Mariusz-Adam Soska
  Piotr Kaminski
   Marko Lukačić
   Edin Junuzović
  Josip Špelić
  Mario Rašić
  Vedran Gavranić
  Igor Mostarlić
  Roberto Stajev
  Kliment Nastoski
  Ljubiša Ljubojević
  Andrej Pečnik
  Darko Andrejaš
  Gašper Jazbec
  Slavko Budna
  Peter Plut
  Andrej Molan
  Dražen Radej
  Albert Kresnik
  Boris Glas
  Miroslav Molan
  Vinko Molan
  Frenk Rozman
  Bojan Štojs
  Robert Nečemer
  Roman Plankar
  Martin Petrič
  Gašper Jazbec
  Slavko Stritar
  Jože Vizler
  Aleš Vajdič
  Alojz Mlakar
  Uroš Šetinc
  Dejan Lazič
  Marko Mitič
  Iztok Kapušin
  Antoni Brdik
  Boštjan Zlobko
  Sašo Rabič
  Rok Zorko
  Simon Pirc
  Damir Panič
  Sašo Fornezzi
  Dejan Kelhar
  Robert Berić
  Boštjan Frelih
  Dejan Rusič
  Tim Vodeb
  Dejan Djermanović
  Darko Karapetrovič
  Senad Jahič
  Uroš Umek
  Matej Šekoranja
  Jaka Ihbeisheh
  Albin Vezirovič
  Miroslav Pilipovič
  Almedin Muharemovič
  Luka Lazanski
  Boštjan Veličevič
  Amel Nadarević
  Denis Mešanovič
  Zoran Omerzu
  Branko Bučar
  Mirsad Mujakić
  Denis Čatić
  Sebastjan Bovha
  Rafael Koren
  Levin Oparenovič
  Denis Bogolin
  Damjan Golob
  Boštjan Hernavs
  Rok Ribič
  Nejc Zavrl
  Boštjan Preskar
  Urban Žigante
  Mitja Žigante
  Rešid Serajić
  Marko Jakolić
  Denis Bogolin
  Damjan Golob
  Boštjan Hernavs
  Rok Ribič
  Nejc Zavrl
  Boštjan Preskar
  Urban Žigante
  Mitja Žigante
  Dejan Bizjak
  David Kastelic
  Marko Kastelic
  Luka Luzar
  Peter Berstovšek
  Danijel Toplek
  Boris Žerjav
  Dejan Forneci
  Boštjan Hodžar
  Danijel Dežmar
  Rok Kmetič
  Gregor Jordan
  Jure Špiler
  Janez-Pavel Vrčko
  Rok Rožman
  Sašo Ribič
  Dejan Mitrovič
  Alen Nadarević
  Boris Černoga
  Gašper Jarc
  Edin Salkič
  Ermin Draganovič
  David Moškon
  Matej Grilc
  Bujar Idrizi
  Marko Radeljak
  Mario Radeljak
  Alen Djonlić
  Bojan Rodman
  Mitja Drame
  Rok Zagorc

External sources
 NK Krško players from A-Z at Worldfootball

 
Lists of association football players by club in Slovenia
Association football player non-biographical articles